Mehrdad Raissi Ardali, born  in Iran, is a prolific Iranian voice actor, dubbing director, founder, director, CEO and Quality Control Manager of Glory Entertainment (The Association of Tehran Young Voice Actors). He has also provided Persian voices for several animation characters, including famous characters such as Donkey in Shrek, Marty in Madagascar, Madagascar: Escape 2 Africa and Madagascar 3: Europe's Most Wanted, Buck in Ice Age: Dawn of the Dinosaurs, Bolt in Bolt, Carl Fredricksen in Up, Flynn Rider in Tangled, The Once-ler in The Lorax, RJ in Over the Hedge, Francesco Bernoulli in Cars 2, Mr. Ping in Kung fu Panda, Ramon in Happy Feet 2, The Man in the Yellow Hat in Curious George, Raoul in A Monster in Paris, Kevin in Ben 10 Ultimate Alien: Cosmic Destruction, Barry in Bee Movie, Bunnymund in Rise of the Guardians, Guy in The Croods and Kristoff in Frozen (2013 film).

Education and career

Mehrdad Raissi studied computer software engineering at University of Science and Culture in Tehran. He started dubbing animations and movies in 2003. Different channels of Islamic Republic of Iran Broadcasting, i.e. Channel 2, Namayesh, Pouya Cartoon Channel, home video companies having the Ministry of Culture and Islamic Guidance permit, directors, domestic and foreign animation producers, the UN and Radio Javan have broadcast his works. Mehrdad Raissi has received certificates of appreciation from IRIB TV5, the 16th Festival of the Capital Cities of Iran's Provinces' TV-Radio Products and the UN - WFP.

In 2006 he published the first professional dubbing periodical called Dubbing in Iran which provided information on dubbing. He has also directed a 15-episode program called The Eighth Art – each episode 40 minutes long – which was created for IRIB TV5 and was about dubbing and voice acting. Mehrdad Raissi has equipped the Association of Tehran Young Voice Actors with 10 digital recording studios. He has been holding regular voice acting auditions for animations/movies since 2003 and has trained more than 380 up-and-coming voice actors. Mehrdad Raissi has also been auditioning journalists for animation voice acting for free since 2006.

In 2010, during a formal ceremony, he paid tribute to Ali Kassmaei and Arshak Ghookasian, pioneers in dubbing in Iran, and named two of the studios of the Association of Tehran Young Voice Actors after them.

In 2011 he, as the head of the policy-making board, published the first and only voice acting magazine called Sedapisheh in Iran. He holds the record for the highest selling dubbed animations in Iran. In 2011 he attended Annecy International Animated Film Festival and met Carlos Saldanha and invited him to come to Iran to exchange information regarding animation making and voice acting. Mehrdad Raissi has written the Persian lyrics for a couple of renown musicals such as A Monster in Paris, Tangled, The Nightmare Before Christmas and Frozen (2013 film). In 2012 he started an Internet radio station by the name of Voice of Glory which streams children's stories 24/7.

Awards and honors 
 Receive an appreciation certificate for the best voice actor from IRIB Tehran in 2006
 Receive an appreciation certificate from TDH institute, the Sony and Columbia pictures representative in Iran
 Receive an appreciation statuette from the second computer games festival
 Receive an appreciation certificate in the 16th festival of radio and television productions in provincial centers
 Receive an appreciation certificate from WPF in Iran due to cooperation in announcer affairs and dubbing

Director of voice actors

He has also directed Iranian voice actors in several animated feature films such as:

Finding Nemo
Monsters, Inc.
The Incredibles
Shrek
Shrek 2
Shrek the Third
Shrek Forever After
Kung fu Panda
Wall e
Ice Age
Ice Age: The Meltdown
Ice Age: Dawn of the Dinosaurs
Ice Age: Continental Drift
Bolt
Up
Bee Movie
The Lorax
Rise of the Guardians
Wreck-It Ralph
Tangled
Tehran 1500
Simorgh's Heart
Masouleh
Mina va Palang
Quest of Persia
The Smurfs
Mixed Nutz
Cloudy with a Chance of Meatballs
Corpse Bride
Chicken Little
The Princess and the Frog
Everyone's Hero
Wallace and Gromit: The Curse of the Were-Rabbit
Meet the Robinsons
The Nutcracker in 3D
Spirit: Stallion of the Cimarron
Curious George
Monster House
Mulan
Mulan II
The Polar Express
Brother Bear
Brother Bear 2
Robots
The Prince of Egypt
Lion King 1 1/2
Despicable Me
Sinbad: Legend of the Seven Seas
Antz
Brave
The Croods
Monsters University
Frozen

Voice acting

Director of voice actors in Tehran 1500 

Mehrdad Raissi has directed Iranian voice actors/actors Bahram Radan, Hedieh Tehrani, Mohammad Reza Sharifinia, Gohar Khayrandish, Habib Rezaei, Mahtab Nassirpour, Hessam Navvab Safavi and Mehran Modiri in Tehran 1500 which is the first Iranian animation feature directed by Bahram Azimi.

TV Shows Director
 The Eighth art (persian: هنر هشتم) TV show, 2007
 Tamashakhane, summer 2008
 Gaffe Show, winter 2017 and summer 2020 
 Bekhandim Podcasts 
 Joystick TV Show, 2018 and summer 2020 
 Jackpot TV show, 2019

See also
 Majid Habibi
 Ali Caszadeh Mataki

References

External links

Glory Entertainment (The Association of Tehran Young Voice Actors)
Voice of Glory
Links of Glory

1978 births
Living people
Iranian male voice actors
Iranian voice directors